The Holden Fishermans Bend Plant was a industrial park opened in 1936 in Fishermans Bend, Victoria, as Holden's headquarters. The new location was opened due to many issues with its previous City Road facility. The park was also intended to kickstart a Victorian leg of the General Motors subsidiaries Chevrolet and Vauxhall.

In 1948, the plant facilitated the production of the first Holden-branded motor vehicle, the Holden 48-215. In 1956, due to an inability to meet demand, the assembly section of the plant was closed, succeeded by the new Dandenong plant. The Fishermans Bend plant also produced engines and driveline components for all domestic and most exported vehicles up until 2016, when the Australian LFX V6 was discontinued. Since 2020, the area is no longer used by Holden for manufacturing or administration. In 2021, it was announced that the University of Melbourne planned to redevelop the area as the headquarters of its school of engineering, with plans to open in 2024.

Products
After production of the Commodore VL engines ceased, the engine division became known as 'Holden Engine Company' (Aka. HEC)

Pre-Holden
 Misc. Chevrolets
 Misc. Vauxhalls

Vehicles
 Holden 48-215
 Holden 50-2106
 Holden FJ

Engines
 Holden straight-six motor
 Holden V8 engine
 GM 3800 V6 engine
 GM High Feature V6 engine

Transmissions
 Holden Manual transmission

Differentials
 Holden Banjo differential
 Holden Salisbury differential

Notes
1. The facility was alternatively named the General Motors Holden Port Melbourne plant

References

Former motor vehicle assembly plants
General Motors factories
Holden
Industrial buildings in Melbourne
Motor vehicle assembly plants in Australia
University of Melbourne buildings
1936 establishments in Australia
2016 disestablishments in Australia